The Gévora or Xévora is a tributary of the Guadiana, in the southwest of the Iberian Peninsula. It runs through both Portugal and Spain.

It has its source in the Serra de São Mamede (Portugal), at 1,027 metres above sea level. Featuring a total length of 73.81 km, the river, running initially roughly from west to east, takes a southern turn in Spain, eventually emptying into the Guadiana near Badajoz.

Some of its main left-bank tributaries are the Jola, Guarranque and Zapatón, while its right-bank tributaries include the Gevorete, Codosero and Abrilongo.

References

Informational notes

Citations

Rivers of Portugal
Rivers of Extremadura